The 8th Edward Jancarz Memorial was the 2001 version of the Edward Jancarz Memorial. It took place on 15 July in the Stal Gorzów Stadium in Gorzów Wielkopolski, Poland. The Memorial was won by Rune Holta who beat Andreas Jonsson, Robert Sawina and Mariusz Staszewski in the final.

Heat details 
 15 July 2001 (Sunday)
 Best time: 63.07 - Andreas Jonsson in heat 9
 Attendance:
 Referee: Józef Piekarski

Heat after heat 
 (63,94) Staszewski, Holta, Sawina, Bajerski
 (63,81) Świst, Walasek, Jonsson, Gollob (R4)
 (63,81) Jensen, Paluch, Dados, Aszenberg
 (64,31) Hućko, Danno, Drabik, Cieślewicz
 (64,69) Cieślewicz, Dados, Staszewski, Świst
 (63,46) Holta, Paluch, Danno, Jonsson (R3)
 (64,50) Hućko, Walasek, Sawina, Aszenberg
 (64,88) Drabik, Bajerski, Jensen, Gollob
 (63,07) Jonsson, Staszewski, Aszenberg, Drabik (Fx)
 (63,37) Holta, Jensen, Świst, Hućko
 (64,97) Sawina, Dados, Danno, Gollob (R4)
 (64,50) Paluch, Bajerski, Cieślewicz, Walasek (F4)
 (64,81) Staszewski, Jensen, Walasek, Danno
 (64,91) Gollob, Holta, Cieślewicz, Aszenberg (R4)
 (64,22) Sawina, Paluch, Świst, Drabik (R4)
 (64,60) Jonsson, Hućko, Bajerski, Dados
 (65,50) Gollob, Staszewski, Paluch, Hućko
 (64,06) Holta, Walasek, Dados, Drabik
 (64,12) Jonsson, Sawina, Jensen, Cieślewicz (M)
 (66,28) Bajerski, Świst, Śpiewanek, Danno, Aszenberg (-)
 The final (top four riders)
 (63,31) Holta, Jonsson, Sawina, Staszewski

See also 
 motorcycle speedway
 2001 in sports

References

External links 
 (Polish) Stal Gorzów Wlkp. official webside

Memorial
2001
Edward J